Thaddeus (Latin Thaddaeus, Ancient Greek Θαδδαῖος Thaddaĩos, from Aramaic תדי Ṯaday) is a male given name.

As of the 1990 Census, Thaddeus was the 611th most popular male name in the United States, while Thad, its diminutive version, was the 846th most popular.

Alternate forms
Taco – Dutch
Tadeu (ind. Tade) – Albanian
Թադէոս ("Tadeos"), Թադևոս ("Tadevos"), Թաթոս ("Tatos") – Armenian
Tadija – Croatian
Tadeáš – Czech
Thaddée – French
თადეოზი (tadeozi) Georgian
Thaddäus – German
Tádé – Hungarian
Tadáias (Biblical), Tadhg (given name) – Irish
Taddeo – Italian
Tadejs – Latvian
Tadas – Lithuanian
Thadhewoos – Malayalam
Tadeusz, Tadzio – Polish
Tadeu – Portuguese
Тадэвуш ("Tadevush") – Belarusian
Фаддей ("Faddey") or Фадей ("Fadey") – Russian
Фадей ("Fadey") – Ukrainian
Тадеј (Tadej), Тадија (Tadija) – Serbian
Tadej – Slovenian
Tadeo – Spanish
Tadewos – Amharic
Other variations: Taddeus, Thaddeus, Tadeus

Biblical figures
Thaddaeus, usually identified as Jude the Apostle, one of the Twelve Apostles of Jesus
Thaddeus of Edessa, one of the Seventy Disciples

Orthodox saints
Apostle Jude son of James (Lebbaeus, Thaddeus), brother of Jesus,
Thaddeus of Edessa, one of the Seventy Disciples, bishop of Beirut,
Venerable Thaddeus of Lukh,
New Hieromartyr Archbishop Thaddeus (Uspensky) of Tver,
Venerable Thaddeus of Stepantsminda,
Venerable Thaddeus the Confessor of the Studion,
Saints Thaddeus.

People

Thaddeus 
Thaddeus of Naples (fl. 1291), crusade chronicler
Thaddeus (bishop of Caffa), 14th-century Armenian Catholic friar and bishop
Thaddeus Bullard, American professional wrestler better known as Titus O'Neil
Thaddeus Cahill (1867–1934), American inventor of the telharmonium
Thaddeus P. Dryja, American ophthalmologist and geneticist
Thaddeus Grauer, Austrian art dealer
Thaddeus William Harris (1795–1856), American entomologist, botanist and librarian
Thaddäus Huber (1742–1798), Austrian violinist and composer
Thaddeus B. Hurd, American architect and amateur historian
Thaddeus Kosciuszko, Polish general in the American Revolution
Thaddeus S. C. Lowe (1831–1913), American Civil War scientist and inventor
Thaddeus McCotter (born 1965), American politician
Thaddeus Moss (born 1998), American football player
Thaddeus O'Sullivan (born 1947), Irish film director, cinematographer, and screenwriter
Ari Thaddeus Pilichowski, 20th-century French-British linguist and conference interpreter, better known as Teddy Pilley
Thaddeus Coleman Pound (1833–1914), Lieutenant Governor of Wisconsin and grandfather of Ezra Pound
Thaddeus Stevens (1792–1868), leader of the Radical Republicans during the American Civil War and Reconstruction
Thaddeus Young, American basketball player for the Toronto Raptors
Thaddeus Joy, boat captain of "Seneca Chief" on Erie Canal.

Thad 
Thad Jones (1923–1986), American jazz trumpeter and bandleader
Thad Lewis (born 1987), American National Football League quarterback
Thad Luckinbill, American actor on the soap opera The Young and the Restless
Thad Starner, American computer scientist, professor at the Georgia Institute of Technology College of Computing, technical lead of Google Glass

Fictional characters
 General Thaddeus E. "Thunderbolt" Ross, Marvel comics character, mainly an antagonist of Hulk
 Doctor Thaddeus Bodog Sivana, DC comics character, an antagonist of Captain Marvel
 Thaddeus Sholto, character in The Sign of the Four by Sir Arthur Conan Doyle
 Tadzio, character in the film and novella Death in Venice by Thomas Mann
 Thaddeus Beaumont in The Dark Half by Stephen King
 Tadeus, character in "Requiem: a Halucination" by Antonio Tabucchi
 Thaddeus Caractacus Evillard “Pecker” Bird, major Character in the Starbuck Chronicle by Bernard Cornwell
 "The Chief" in the CONTROL spy agency in Get Smart
 Thaddeus Thatch, paternal grandfather of Milo James Thatch in Atlantis: The Lost Empire
 Thaddeus Bile, a character in the 2001 Disney/Pixar animated film Monsters, Inc.
 Thaddeus, character in the film Your Highness
 Dr. Thaddeus Morocco, an antagonist in the animated series Transformers: Rescue Bots
 Thad Castle, on television series Blue Mountain State
 Thaddeus "Rusty" Venture, on the animated series The Venture Bros.
 Tadzio, in the film of Death in Venice
 Thaddeus Bradley, in the movie Now You See Me
 Brother Thaddeus, in the film Heaven Help Us

See also
Taddei
Tadeo Gomez, an American musician

References 

English masculine given names
Greek masculine given names
Latin masculine given names
German masculine given names
Dutch masculine given names
Norwegian masculine given names
Swedish masculine given names
Danish masculine given names
Hebrew masculine given names

de:Thaddäus